Jonathan Ligali (born 28 May 1991) is a French former professional footballer who played as a goalkeeper.

Club career
Ligali was promoted to the Montpellier first team before the beginning of the 2009–10 season. He was given the squad number 30. On 1 December 2012, Ligali made his professional debut in a league match against Lyon.

International career
Ligali was born in France, and is of Beninese descent through his mother. After representing France at youth level, Ligali switched his international allegiance to Benin in October 2018.

References

External links
Jonathan Ligali at Foot mercato

1991 births
Living people
Footballers from Montpellier
French footballers
France youth international footballers
French sportspeople of Beninese descent
Association football goalkeepers
Montpellier HSC players
USL Dunkerque players
Ligue 1 players
Championnat National players
Black French sportspeople